Lindau is a municipality in the district of Pfäffikon in the canton of Zürich in Switzerland.

History

Lindau is first mentioned in 774 as Lintauvia.

Geography
Of this area, 47.4% is used for agricultural purposes, while 34% is forested. Of the rest of the land, 18.2% is settled (buildings or roads) and the remainder (0.3%) is non-productive (rivers, glaciers or mountains).   housing and buildings made up 9% of the total area, while transportation infrastructure made up the rest (9.1%). Of the total unproductive area, water (streams and lakes) made up 0.2% of the area.   13.7% of the total municipal area was undergoing some type of construction.

The municipality if located in the western portion of the lower Kempt valley.  It includes the villages of Lindau, Tagelswangen, Winterberg and Grafstal.

Demographics
, 18.3% of the population was made up of foreign nationals.   the gender distribution of the population was 51% male and 49% female. Over the last 10 years the population has grown at a rate of 33%. Most of the population speaks German  (85.6%), with Italian being second most common ( 3.7%) and Serbo-Croatian being third ( 3.0%).

In the 2007 election the most popular party was the SVP which received 40% of the vote.  The next three most popular parties were the SPS (14.5%), the FDP (11.7%) and the CSP (11.1%).

The age distribution of the population is children and teenagers (0–19 years old) make up 26.7% of the population, while adults (20–64 years old) make up 63.9% and seniors (over 64 years old) make up 9.4%.  The entire Swiss population is generally well educated.  In Lindau about 76.7% of the population (between age 25–64) have completed either non-mandatory upper secondary education or additional higher education (either university or a Fachhochschule).  There are 1545 households in Lindau.

Lindau has an unemployment rate of 2.39%.  , there were 101 people employed in the primary economic sector and about 29 businesses involved in this sector.  791 people are employed in the secondary sector and there are 51 businesses in this sector.  1044 people are employed in the tertiary sector, with 136 businesses in this sector.   47.1% of the working population were employed full-time, and 52.9% were employed part-time.

 there were 1240 Catholics and 2159 Protestants in Lindau. In the 2000 census, religion was broken down into several smaller categories. Of the rest of the population, 0% were Muslim, 11.2% belonged to another religion (not listed), 2.9% did not give a religion, and 9.7% were atheist or agnostic.

The historical population is given in the following table:

Transport 
The municipality of Lindau is served by Kemptthal railway station, which is on the Zurich to Winterthur main line and is served by Zurich S-Bahn service S7.

References

External links

 Official website 
 

Municipalities of the canton of Zürich